Three ships of the Royal Navy have been called HMS Raider.

  was an  launched in 1916
  was a  destroyer launched in 1942. 
  is a GRP  commissioned in 1998

Royal Navy ship names